Burntwood may refer to:

 Burntwood, former mining town and civil parish, it is now a suburban town of the Lichfield District in Staffordshire, England, 
 Burntwood, Kansas, small settlement in Rawlins County, Kansas, United States
 Burntwood River, river in Canada